Bags' Groove (PRLP 7109) is a jazz album by Miles Davis, released in 1957 by Prestige Records, compiling material from two 10" LPs recorded in 1954, plus two alternative takes.

Recording
Both takes of the title track come from a session on December 24, 1954, the first version having been previously released on Miles Davis All Stars, Volume 1 (PRLP 196). ("Bags" was vibraphonist Milt Jackson's nickname.) The other tracks recorded during this session may be found on Miles Davis and the Modern Jazz Giants (PRLP 7150), and all of them are also featured on the compilation album Thelonious Monk: The Complete Prestige Recordings. The rest of the album was recorded earlier in the year, on June 29, and four of the tracks had already been released  as Miles Davis with Sonny Rollins (PRLP 187), with the fifth being a previously unreleased alternative take.

Music
The title track was written by Milt Jackson (“Bags” is his nickname) and the three compositions written by the young Sonny Rollins all went on to become jazz standards. On "Oleo", Davis used the Harmon mute to obtain a peculiar sound, and it would become an important feature of his playing.

Track listing
Prestige – LP 7109:

Personnel
 Miles Davis – trumpet
 Sonny Rollins – tenor saxophone
 Horace Silver – piano
 Percy Heath – bass
 Kenny Clarke – drums

On "Bags' Groove":
 Miles Davis – trumpet
 Milt Jackson – vibraphone
 Thelonious Monk – piano
 Percy Heath – bass
 Kenny Clarke – drums

References

1957 compilation albums
Miles Davis albums
Prestige Records compilation albums
Albums produced by Bob Weinstock
Albums recorded at Van Gelder Studio